is a Japanese film released on August 19, 1995, directed by Yasuyuki Kusuda. It is based on the shōjo manga series, written and illustrated by Yoko Kamio. It is the first the many adaptations of the comics for the screen, and it stars Yuki Uchida as the main character of Makino Tsukushi.

Cast

 Yuki Uchida as Tsukushi Makino
 Shosuke Tanihara as Tsukasa Domyoji
 Naohito Fujiki as Rui Hanazawa
 Koichi Hashizume as Akira Mimasaka
 Kensaku Saeki as Sojiro Nishikado
 Kaori Sakagami as Sakurako Sanjo
 Marie Eguro as Shizuka Todo
 Norika Fujiwara as Minako Yamano
 Akari Tonegawa as Yuriko Asai
 Ai Sasamine as Yuki Matsuoka
 TRF (cameo)

Songs

 Opening theme: "Baby's Growing Up" by Yuki Uchida.
 Ending theme: "Overnight Sensation (Jidai wa Anata ni Yudaneteru)" by TRF.

References

External links

 Hana yori Dango fan page (synopsis and pictures)
 

Boys Over Flowers
1995 films
1990s romance films
Live-action films based on manga
1990s Japanese films

ja:花より男子#1995年（フジテレビ・東映版）